Kåre Hedley Ingebrigtsen (born 11 November 1965) is a Norwegian professional football manager, executive and former player, who played as a midfielder. He currently serves as the manager of Ranheim.

Ingebrigtsen was nicknamed "Bruttern" ("the brother") during his career at Rosenborg, which was coined by friend and former teammate Jahn Ivar Jakobsen.

Club career
Ingebrigtsen played for Rosenborg, Lillestrøm, Manchester City, Strømsgodset, Byåsen and Malvik.

He made 17 appearances for Manchester City, scoring three goals, all of them in an FA Cup match against Leicester City on 8 January 1994.

International career
Ingebrigtsen earned 23 caps for Norway. He netted on his debut on 7 November 1990 in a 3–1 friendly away victory over Tunisia.

Managerial career
In December 2004, Ingebrigtsen took charge of Rosenborg youth side. He became the manager of 2. divisjon side Ranheim in September 2006, before returning to Rosenborg in October 2007, where he acted as an assistant.

Bodø/Glimt
At the end of the year, Ingebrigtsen was appointed as manager of Bodø/Glimt. He remained at the club until July 2011 when he left his post as manager due to poor results.

In April 2012, Ingebrigtsen took a short break from management to work as a car salesman. He later worked as an assistant for Viking from July 2012 until July 2014.

Rosenborg
In the summer of 2014, Rosenborg were on the look out for an interim manager after sacking Per Joar Hansen, and they turned to Ingebrigtsen.

After a poor start with three losses and only one win in his first four league matches, their form improved and they finished the season with nine wins out of ten matches in second place, thus qualifying for an UEFA Europa League qualifying spot. As a result, Ingebrigtsen was offered the managerial job on a permanent basis.

During his time at Rosenborg, Ingebrigtsen guided them to three straight league titles, two Norwegian Football Cup titles and two Norwegian Super Cup titles as well as qualifying for the group stages of the UEFA Europa League twice in three seasons.

Oostende
On 6 May 2019, Ingebrigtsen signed a two-year contract with Belgian First Division A side Oostende.

APOEL
Kåre Ingebritsen signed for APOEL 27 December 2019. He was sacked 11 February 2020.

Return to Norway
On 8 August 2020, Ingrebrigtsen was appointed manager of Brann. On 19 July 2021, he was dismissed.

On 29 October 2021, he was hired as sporting director for Åsane.

Managerial statistics

Honours

Player
Rosenborg
1. divisjon/Tippeligaen: 1988, 1990, 1992, 1993
Norwegian Football Cup: 1988, 1990, 1992

Manager
Rosenborg
Tippeligaen/Eliteserien: 2015, 2016, 2017
Norwegian Football Cup: 2015, 2016
Mesterfinalen: 2017, 2018

Individual
Eliteserien Coach of the Year: 2017

References

External links

Kåre Ingebrigtsen at Altomfotball.no 

1965 births
Living people
Norwegian footballers
Norway international footballers
Eliteserien players
Premier League players
Manchester City F.C. players
Rosenborg BK players
Lillestrøm SK players
Strømsgodset Toppfotball players
Byåsen Toppfotball players
Norwegian football managers
Ranheim Fotball managers
FK Bodø/Glimt managers
K.V. Oostende managers
APOEL FC managers
Expatriate footballers in England
Footballers from Trondheim
Norwegian expatriate footballers
Rosenborg BK non-playing staff
Viking FK non-playing staff
Rosenborg BK managers
SK Brann managers
Eliteserien managers
Norwegian expatriate sportspeople in England
Norwegian expatriate sportspeople in Belgium
Norwegian expatriate sportspeople in Cyprus
Norwegian expatriate football managers
Expatriate football managers in Belgium
Expatriate football managers in Cyprus
Association football midfielders